= Secret practice =

Folk healing practice

The secret practice (French: [səkʁɛ]), or practice of secrecy (French: pratique du secret), is a folk healing practice, encountered in some European countries, particularly in Francophone Alpine communities, such as Romand Switzerland and Aosta Valley, and probably dating back to the Christian Middle Ages.

== Description ==
Practitioners are known as faiseurs de secret (French for "makers of the secret") or guérisseurs (French for "healers").

The practice involves treating certain ailments with a formula, generally a short prayer often associated with a few gestures made by the hand or fingers towards the patient's body, such as a sign of the cross for example.

This whole process is called a "secret" insofar as it is known only to its practitioners and its disclosure to third parties is supposed to make it lose its effectiveness. It was not until shortly before his death that the secret maker is supposed to pass it on. The transmission is traditionally, but not always, made to one of their descendants or another member of their family.
